Volodymyr Kobzarev is a Soviet midfielder and coach from Ukraine.

Kobzarev resigned after a home loss of FC Dnipro to CSKA Kyiv on 17 April 1999. At that time Dnipro was placing 14 among 16 teams.

References

External links
 Volodymyr Kobzarev on football.lg.ua
 List of all coaches of Zorya Luhansk on zarya.lg.ua
 Volodymyr Kobzarev on footballfacts.ru

1957 births
Living people
Footballers from Luhansk
Soviet footballers
Ukrainian footballers
Soviet Top League players
FC Zorya Luhansk players
FC CSKA Kyiv players
FC Dnipro players
FC Shakhtar Pavlohrad players
Ukrainian football managers
Ukrainian expatriate football managers
Expatriate football managers in Russia
FC Zorya Luhansk managers
FC Metalurh Novomoskovsk managers
FC Dnipro managers
FC Dnipro-2 Dnipropetrovsk managers
Ukrainian Premier League managers

Association football midfielders